Scraptoft Hall is a former Georgian country house in the village of Scraptoft, Leicestershire, England. A Grade II* listed building, it has since been converted to apartments. 

The hall was built in 1723, based on a previous 17th-century house, for the widow of Sir Edward Wigley. A rear wing was added in 1896. The 5-window frontage is ashlar built in 3 storeys plus basement. The hall was inherited by Edward Wigley's son James, MP for Leicester, who laid out the ornamental lake and gardens. The front boundary wall and ornamental iron gates are separately Grade II* listed.

After James Wigley's death, the estate passed to his great-nephew, Edward Hartopp, who then took the additional surname of Wigley. It descended in the Hartopp family until they disposed of it after the First World War. After passing through a number of different hands it was acquired by Leicester Corporation in 1954 as the site for a new teachers' training college, the City of Leicester College of Education in Scraptoft, the Hall itself acting as the college principal's residence. The college became Scraptoft Campus of De Montfort University until it was closed in 2003, after which the college buildings were demolished. The Hall has since been restored for use as an apartment building.

References

Grade II* listed buildings in Leicestershire
Country houses in Leicestershire